NLM may stand for:

 National Liberation Movement (disambiguation)
 National Literacy Mission Programme, India, from 1988
 NetWare Loadable Module, by Novell
 Network Lock Manager, a Unix Network File System (NFS) protocol
 NLM CityHopper, a former Dutch airline
 NLM Nederlandse Luchtvaart Maatschappij, a former Dutch airline
 Norwegian Lutheran Mission
 United States National Library of Medicine